Ciutat Esportiva Juan Ángel Romero is the training ground and academy base of the Spanish football club Elche CF. It was opened in 1980.

Located in Elche and covering an area of 100,000 m², it is used for youth and senior teams trainings.

Facilities
 Campo de fútbol José Díez Iborra with a capacity of 3,000 seats, is the home stadium of Elche CF Ilicitano, the reserve team of Elche CF.
 1 grass pitch.
 3 artificial pitches.
 4 mini artificial pitches.
 2 indoor sport halls.
 2 outdoor swimming pools.
 4 outdoor tennis courts.
 Service centre with gymnasium.

References

Elche CF
Association football training grounds in Spain
Sports venues completed in 1980